Sohray may refer to various places in Iran:
 Sohray Amiriyeh
 Sohray Cheghad
 Sohray Ghazanfariyeh-ye Jonubi
 Sohray Kallah Qazi
 Sohray Zareheh

See also
 Sahray (disambiguation), various places in Iran
 Sohra, Iran (disambiguation)